Kolbsheim is a commune in the Bas-Rhin department in Grand Est in north-eastern France.

Between June 1974 and January 1983 the commune was merged with Duppigheim.

Geography
Kolbsheim is an Alsatian village positioned a short distance to the south-west of Strasbourg, and less than two kilometres from Strasbourg Airport.  Adjacent communes are Hangenbieten, Breuschwickersheim and Ernolsheim sur Bruche.

Notable people
 Jacques Maritain

See also
 Château de Kolbsheim
 Communes of the Bas-Rhin department

References

Communes of Bas-Rhin
Bas-Rhin communes articles needing translation from French Wikipedia